Wayfarer Redemption is the name of two trilogies that were released as a single six-book series in the U.S. by fantasy author Sara Douglass, and subdivided into two trilogies: The Axis Trilogy, and The Wayfarer Redemption trilogy. This sequence is followed by the Darkglass Mountain trilogy.

The series is set in a fictitious land containing the lands of Tencendor, also known as Achar, Coroleas, Escator and Isembaard. The background of the series is quite extensive, and the events featured in the novels stem from a series of events that began thousands of years before the beginning of the first book.

The Axis trilogy
The Axis Trilogy is the first three books of the Wayfarer Redemption series.

The Wayfarer Redemption/BattleAxe

The first characters introduced are two unnamed women in mortal danger, one who is pregnant and one who has just given birth. The pregnant one is trying desperately to reach shelter during a snowstorm. She has become an outcast from her people, the Avar, because she has decided to keep her child, conceived during a festival and considered an abomination. A group of demonic creatures, skraelings, watch as her unborn child brutally eats his way out of her womb, killing her. The monsters are delighted and decide to adopt the child.

The second woman, of noble birth, had given birth to an illegitimate child two days earlier, who she believes is dead. After giving birth, she was taken away and left to die in the freezing mountains. She climbs the mountain until she is found by something or someone unknown.

In the book, Axis, the Battle-Axe of the Seneschal, learns the truth of his identity and his destiny as the Starman. Lady Faraday accompanies him as he begins the journey but is called away to serve the Prophecy as TreeFriend; she travels with the Sentinels to Gorkenfort to marry Bornehold (half brother of Axis, also born of Rivkah).

Enchanter

Enchanter mainly concerns the battle between Axis and his half-brother, Borneheld. Axis must unite the three races of Tencendor in order to face Gorgrael, yet Borneheld is determined to prevent him from doing so. StarDrifter and his mother MorningStar turn Axis into one of the most powerful Enchanters the Icarii have ever seen, but discover a terrible secret from his past in the process. Gorgrael plays a much larger role in Enchanter, as does the threatening Dark Man; together they create a creature that wreaks havoc from the skies. Much of Gorgrael's background is revealed, and how he was raised by wraiths. Azhure, a mysterious figure, eventually learns some of the details about her lost past. Faraday learns more of her mission to help the trees but she and Axis both discover how the Prophecy can both lie and manipulate.

In Enchanter the Prophet's sinister presence is felt, and some of his relationships with the Sentinels are revealed.

Axis becomes more and more obsessed by the traitor in the third verse of the Prophecy, with tragic consequences.

The Icarii lifestyle and culture, especially their use of the Star Dance to weave enchantments, is explained is detail.

StarMan

StarMan concludes the story of Axis' battle with Gorgrael. Both Gorgrael and Axis misinterpret the third verse of the prophecy, with unforeseen and tragic results. Axis is betrayed from deep within his camp. New characters included in the third book include: Artor the Plough God; Urbeth, the great icebear of the north; and the Chitter Chatters, who Ho'Demi finds lost down a mine. The world of the Ravensbundmen is also explored in much greater detail.

Following Gorgrael's manipulations, the Gryphon swarm. By the end of the book, the Destroyer has almost 70,000 of them, enough to dominate the skies of Tencendor and overwhelm Axis. Azhure and StarDrifter explore the Island of Mist and Memory, where Azhure's troubled past is finally explained and her origins are revealed, and Azhure and StarDrifter finally resolve their relationship. Artor, annoyed by the progression of events in Achar/Tencendor, takes a personal interest in what's going on, but meets with opposition.

According to Douglass, while StarMan concludes the Axis trilogy, enough loose ends were left for the story to continue. While HarperCollins only bought three of the original four books, the fourth book, Sinner, subsequently became the basis for the next trilogy, The Wayfarer Redemption.

The Wayfarer Redemption trilogy

Note: The Wayfarer Redemption is also another name for Battleaxe, the first book in the Axis series.

Sinner

Pilgrim

Crusader

References

American novel series
Fantasy novel series
High fantasy novels